
Year 669 (DCLXIX) was a common year starting on Monday (link will display the full calendar) of the Julian calendar. The denomination 669 for this year has been used since the early medieval period, when the Anno Domini calendar era became the prevalent method in Europe for naming years.

Events 
 By place 

 Byzantine Empire 
 Spring – Arab forces that have taken Chalcedon, on the Asian shore of the Bosporus, threaten the Byzantine capital Constantinople. The Muslim-Arabs are decimated by famine and disease. Yazid, Arab commander, retreats to the island of Cyzicus (modern Turkey). 

 Britain 
 King Ecgberht of Kent loses the overlordship of Surrey to King Wulfhere of Mercia. Ecgberht then grants the old Saxon Shore Fort at Reculver (south-east England) to a priest named Bassa, in order to establish a monastery dedicated to St. Mary (approximate date).

 Asia 
 November 14 – Kamatari, Japanese statesman and reformer, receives the surname Fujiwara from Emperor Tenji as a reward for his services, but dies in Yamato prefecture (modern-day Sakurai City).

Births 
 Gregory II, pope of the Catholic Church (d. 731)
 Justinian II, Byzantine emperor (approximate date)
 Qutayba ibn Muslim, Arab general (approximate date)

Deaths 
 November 14 – Fujiwara no Kamatari, founder of the Fujiwara clan (b. 614) 
 December 31 – Li Shiji, general and chancellor of the Tang Dynasty (b. 594)
 Jaruman, bishop of Mercia (approximate date)
 Mezezius, Byzantine usurper (approximate date)

References